Bitter End is an unincorporated community in Carter County, Tennessee, United States.

The Markland Cemetery is located north of the settlement.  A historic school, the Bitter End School, was located to the south.

Bitter End has been noted for its unusual place name.

References

Unincorporated communities in Carter County, Tennessee
Unincorporated communities in Tennessee